The ThinkPad Yoga is a 2-in-1 convertible business-oriented tablet from Lenovo unveiled in September at the 2013 IFA in Berlin, Germany. It was released in the United States in November 2013.

Design and performance
The ThinkPad Yoga series laptops has a "backlit" keyboard that flattens when flipped into tablet mode. This is accomplished with a platform surrounding the keys which rises until level with the keyboard buttons, a locking mechanism that prevents key presses, and feet that pop out to prevent the keyboard from directly resting on flat surfaces. Lenovo implemented this design in response to complaints about its earlier Ideapad Yoga 13 and 11 models being awkward to use in tablet mode. A reinforced hinge was required to implement this design. Other than its convertible form factor, the first ThinkPad Yoga is a rather standard ThinkPad device with a black magnesium-reinforced chassis, island keyboard, a red TrackPoint, and a large buttonless touchpad (but touchpad have been upgraded to a mechanical 3-button version for a next generations of Yoga line).

Models

Zero generation (2013)

Thinkpad Yoga (S1 Yoga 12) 
The first ThinkPad Yoga has a 12.5-inch IPS touchscreen with 1080p resolution. The screen was designed for use with an optional pen-style digitizer. It is powered by Haswell processors from Intel. Buyers are able to choose standard 2.5" hard drives or SSD, and additional M.2 SSD, but have a non-replaceable battery and soldered RAM.

First generation (2014)

Yoga 11e (Windows version) 

The Windows version has the same specs as the Chromebook, but comes with a 320GB hard drive for storage and also accepts SSDs. The memory can be upgraded up to 8GB. Unlike the Chromebook variant, the components of this version can be upgraded.

Yoga 11e Chromebook
The ThinkPad 11e is a Chromebook that has a matte black chassis with reinforced hinges and corners, a sturdy lid, and a rubber bumper protecting its display in order to help it survive accidental dropping, spills, and general rough handling. It uses a quad-core Intel Celeron CPU, has 4 GB of RAM which can not be upgraded, an 11.6 inch screen, and 16GB of eMMC flash storage. Reviewers claim it is somewhat heavier than a typical Chromebook with a weight of 3.1 pounds. This is likely because of its ruggedized and reinforced chassis.

It uses typical ThinkPad-style keyboard with customized ChromeOS keys. It does not have Trackpoint but only a touchpad. The screen is matte with and anti-glare coating and has a resolution of 1366×768 pixels. A 720p webcam is mounted above the screen. It has media card reader, a USB 2.0 port, a USB 3.0 port, and HDMI 1.4 port and a headphone jack. Connectivity is provided by 802.11ac Wi-Fi and Bluetooth 4.0.

The 11e fully supports the openSUSE flavor of the Linux operating system.

S3 Yoga 14
The Yoga 14 model reportedly "strikes the middle ground between bulky workstations and flexible hybrids." The laptop's metal hinge makes it sturdy, flexible and durable but has a below-average battery life. Like other models, the display can bend a full 360 degrees and the keyboard can be folded in half to use as a stand. According to a review for Business News Daily, "The ThinkPad Yoga 14 is a balancing act of diverse features. Thankfully, Lenovo pulled them all together into a satisfying work machine. The notebook features a high-quality build and an excellent keyboard and trackpad — all must-have features for serious productivity. And extras like the TrackPoint pointing stick are great for legacy ThinkPad users who prefer those options."

S5 Yoga 15

Second generation (2015)

11e Yoga (2nd Gen)

Yoga 260
The Yoga 260 uses a lightweight carbon-fiber hybrid material on its lid and magnesium-plastic blend on its lower portion. Lenovo claims the Yoga 260 has been subject to extensive testing of its ability to survive extreme temperatures, vibrations, altitudes, and shocks. Its keyboard is spill resistant. It includes a 12.5-inch display of resolution 1366×768 or 1920×1080. An active stylus, the ThinkPad Pen Pro, is included for drawing and text entry; it can be used with Lenovo's WRITEit hand-writing recognition application. A large fingerprint reader is included for logging into a user account.

The design of Yoga 260 is in the same generation as the ThinkPad X260, which features 6th generation Intel Core i processors, same display resolution choices, same supported operating systems.

Yoga 460 and P40 Yoga
Yoga 460 is a base model with only integrated graphics.

The ThinkPad P40 Yoga, like other Yoga branded products, is a convertible device with "laptop, stand, tent, and tablet" modes. The P40 Yoga includes a touchscreen display with resolution of 1920×1080 or 2560×1440, designed in cooperation with Wacom, using that company's Active ES technology which can sense 2,048 different pressure levels. The screen works with a stylus called the ThinkPad Pen Pro that has various pen tips designed to give varied forms of tactile feedback. The P40 uses Intel Core i7 CPUs, can accommodate up to 16 gigabytes of RAM, has SSDs up to 512 gigabytes in size, and uses an Nvidia Quadro M500M GPU.

Third generation (2016)

11e Yoga (3rd Gen)

11e Yoga Chromebook (3rd Gen)

X1 Yoga
The ThinkPad X1 Yoga is a revamp of the ThinkPad X1 Carbon that includes the multi-mode flexibility of the Yoga line and a 14-inch display with optional OLED technology. The display has a resolution of 2560×1440 pixels.

Fourth generation (2017)

11e Yoga (4th Gen)

11e Yoga Chromebook (4th Gen)

Yoga 370
A 13.3 inch replacement for the Yoga 260, with 7th generation Intel Core processors.

X1 Yoga (2nd Gen) 
Changes from previous X1 Yoga includes the use of 7th generation Intel Core i ('Kaby Lake') processors, addition of Thunderbolt 3 ports, USB-C connector for power adapter, 'wave' style keyboard featuring matte finish on the keyboard.

Fifth generation (2018)

11e Yoga (5th Gen)

L380 Yoga
More affordable version of the X380 Yoga, with replaceable RAM, but lacking Thunderbolt.

X380 Yoga
A smaller 13.3" derivative of the X1 Yoga.

X1 Yoga (3rd Gen) 
The design is derived from 6th generation ThinkPad X1 Carbon, with the ThinkShutter privacy camera included by default (except for models with a IR camera), 15W 8th generation Core i5/i7 quad core processors and a built-in stylus. OLED screens are no longer an option.

Sixth generation (2019)

L390 Yoga
More affordable version of the X390 Yoga with replaceable RAM, but lacking thunderbolt.

X390 Yoga
A smaller 13.3" derivative of the X1 Yoga.

X1 Yoga (4th Gen) 
The design is derived from 7th generation ThinkPad X1 Carbon. This is notably the first ThinkPad with aluminum chassis. 15W 8th/10th generation Core i5/i7 quad core processors and a built-in stylus.

Seventh generation (2020)

11e Yoga (6th Gen)

L13 Yoga (1st Gen)
Released on the 27 August 2019, the more affordable version of the X13 Yoga, but lacking thunderbolt. Successor of the L390 which breaks the naming scheme. It no longer has replaceable RAM.

X13 Yoga (1st Gen)
Released on the 24 February 2020, the smaller 13.3" derivative of the X1 Yoga. Successor of the X390 which breaks the naming scheme.

X1 Yoga (5th Gen) 
The design is derived from 8th generation ThinkPad X1 Carbon. 10th generation Core i5/i7 quad core processors and a built-in stylus.

Eighth generation (2021)

Reviews
Dan Ackerman of CNET wrote, "In our brief hands-on time with the ThinkPad Yoga, while it's made of tough, light magnesium alloy, it didn't feel as slick and coffee shop ready as the IdeaPad version (and it lacks the extremely high-res screen of the Yoga 2), but the hidden keyboard think  is so fascinating, you'll find yourself folding the lid back and forth over and over again just to watch it in action."

Brittany Hillen of Slashgear wrote, "The ThinkPad Yoga is a hybrid machine with a lot to offer users as both a laptop and as a tablet, though in slate mode it is thicker than what you'd get with a traditional tablet. There is nothing ill to speak of regarding the ThinkPad Yoga -- everything about it is solid, with the exception perhaps being a lower quality stylus than what an artist would need. The construction feels solid and durable in the hands, the keyboard is comfortable for typing in long duration stints, and the hardware is capable for a variety of tasks."

James Kendrick of ZDNET wrote, "The ThinkPad Yoga is a great work laptop that can be pressed into tablet duty when desired. Its heavy-duty ThinkPad construction will stand up to the rigors of a road warrior. The battery life is reasonable and the beautiful screen works well in both laptop and tablet modes."

The ThinkPad Yoga X1, (the first metal ThinkPad) has been given excellent reviews, with some review sites giving the new model a score of 4.5/5 stars.

See also 

Ideapad Yoga
ThinkPad X series
ThinkPad L series

References 

Lenovo laptops
2-in-1 PCs
Yoga